Alessandra Montesano (born 13 June 1998) is an Italian rower. She competed in the women's quadruple sculls event at the 2020 Summer Olympics.

References

External links
 Ohio State Buckeyes bio
 

1998 births
Living people
Italian female rowers
Olympic rowers of Italy
Rowers at the 2020 Summer Olympics
People from Casalmaggiore
Ohio State Buckeyes rowers
Sportspeople from the Province of Cremona